Hamza Abu Faris, is a Libyan scholar and politician who was born in Msallata on 13 January 1946. He was named Awqaf & Islamic Affairs Minister on 22 November 2011 by Abdurrahim El-Keib.

Education

Hamza Abu Faris was awarded a teaching certificate in Arabic language and religion teaching from Tripoli in 1967. In 1971 he earned a secondary certificate in the Department of Literature and then advanced to study at the Teachers' College for Higher Education in Tripoli.

Abu Faris obtained his bachelor's degree in French Language and Literature after studying at the Department of Languages.

He earned his master's degree from Al Fateh University in Islamic Studies under the supervision of Dr. Abd' al-Salaam Abu Naji in 1984.

In 2000 Hamza Abu Faris received his Ph.D in Islamic Sciences, with an emphasis in comparative Fiqh (Islamic jurisprudence) from the University of Zaytuna in Tunisia; his doctoral thesis was entitled "Judge Abdul Wahab al-Baghdadi and his approach to Exegesis of the Prophetic Message."

Religious Training

Hamza Abu Faris' relationship with Shariaa sciences (knowledge and training in Islamic legal traditions) begins, at the hands of a local village Shaikh; he completed memorizing the Qur'an in 1982.

Specialties: 
Maliki jurisprudence from (al Malik's) famous works
Tawhid (principle of God's oneness)
The science of Hadith (traditions concerning the life of the Prophet Mohamed)
Quranic exegesis
Muwatta (a foundational text in the Maliki school of Islamic jurisprudence)
al-Zurqani's exegesis thereof
Sahih al Bukhari (canonical Hadith compilation)
Sahih Muslim (canonical Hadith compilation)

Special expertise in the fields of inheritance and jurisprudential knowledge.

Teaching career

Hamza Abu Faris taught at high school level for several years before teaching at the Faculty of Law at the University of Benghazi and later at the Faculty of Law of Nasser University of Tarhuna. Abu Faris was later appointed to the Faculty of Law at Al Fateh University in Tripoli.

Other Activities

Served as co-researcher for the Fiqh Council of the Muslim World League in Mecca, and the European Council for Fatwa and Research.

Participated in a TV program called Islam and Lifestyles on local Libyan TV Channel, which was broadcast live on Fridays and Saturdays.

References

External links
 Hamza Abu Faris Personal Website (AR)
 Hamza Abu Faris CV (AR)

Government ministers of Libya
Libyan scholars
Living people
Members of the National Transitional Council
Members of the Interim Government of Libya
1946 births
University of Libya alumni
University of Tripoli alumni
University of Ez-Zitouna alumni
Academic staff of the University of Benghazi
Academic staff of the University of Tripoli